Elisabeth Minnig  (born 6 January 1987) is an Argentine retired footballer who played as a goalkeeper. She was a member of the Argentina women's national team.

International career
Minnig represented Argentina at the 2007 FIFA Women's World Cup.

References

1987 births
Living people
Sportspeople from Buenos Aires Province
Argentine women's footballers
Women's association football goalkeepers
Boca Juniors (women) footballers
Argentina women's international footballers
2007 FIFA Women's World Cup players
Footballers at the 2011 Pan American Games
Competitors at the 2014 South American Games
South American Games gold medalists for Argentina
South American Games medalists in football
Argentine people of Volga German descent
Pan American Games competitors for Argentina